Mark R. Hardy (born May 3, 1988) is a Canadian former professional baseball pitcher. Prior to beginning his professional career, he played college baseball at the University of British Columbia. Hardy has also competed for the Canadian national baseball team.

Career
Hardy enrolled at the University of British Columbia (UBC), where he played college baseball for the UBC Thunderbirds baseball team, competing in the National Association of Intercollegiate Athletics. Hardy had a 17–3 win–loss record in his junior and senior seasons at UBC. He played collegiate summer baseball for the Okotoks Dawgs in the Western Major Baseball League.

The San Diego Padres selected Hardy in the 43rd round (1,294th overall) of the 2010 Major League Baseball draft. He received a $1,000 signing bonus and a plane ticket upon signing. In 2010, Hardy played for the Arizona League Padres of the Rookie-level Arizona League, the Eugene Emeralds of the Class-A Short Season Northwest League, and the Lake Elsinore Storm of the Class-A Advanced California League. In 2011, he pitched for the Fort Wayne TinCaps of the Class-A Midwest League.

Hardy has played for the Canadian national baseball team. He appeared in the 2008 World University Baseball Championship, winning the earned run average (ERA) award, with a 0.00 ERA in round-robin play. In 2011, he participated in the Baseball World Cup, winning the bronze medal, and the Pan American Games, winning the gold medal.

References

External links

1988 births
Living people
Arizona League Padres players
Baseball people from British Columbia
Baseball pitchers
Baseball players at the 2011 Pan American Games
Canadian expatriate baseball players in the United States
Eugene Emeralds players
Fort Wayne TinCaps players
Lake Elsinore Storm players
Pan American Games gold medalists for Canada
Pan American Games medalists in baseball
People from Campbell River, British Columbia
Québec Capitales players
San Antonio Missions players
Sportspeople from British Columbia
UBC Thunderbirds baseball players
Winnipeg Goldeyes players
World Baseball Classic players of Canada
Medalists at the 2011 Pan American Games